NCSS is a statistics package produced and distributed by NCSS, LLC. Created in 1981 by Jerry L. Hintze, NCSS, LLC specializes in providing statistical analysis software to researchers, businesses, and academic institutions.  It also produces PASS Sample Size Software which is used in scientific study planning and evaluation.

The NCSS package includes over 250 documented statistical and plot procedures. NCSS imports and exports all major spreadsheet, database, and statistical file formats.

Major statistical topics in NCSS 

 Analysis of Variance
 Appraisal Methods
 Charts and Graphs
 Correlation
 Cross Tabulation
 Curve Fitting
 Descriptive Statistics
 Design of Experiments
 Diagnostic Tests
 Forecasting
 General Linear Models
 Meta-Analysis
 Mixed Models
 Multivariate
 Proportions
 Quality Control
 Regression Analysis
 Reliability Analysis
 Repeated Measures
 ROC Curves
 Survival Analysis
 Time Series Analysis
 T-Tests

See also
List of statistical packages
Comparison of statistical packages

References

External links
 Official NCSS Homepage
 NCSS Documentation
 NCSS in the cloud

Further reading
 

Windows-only software
Regression and curve fitting software
Time series software